Kollin Raymond Moore (born May 2, 1997) is an American freestyler wrestler and graduated folkstyle wrestler who competes at 97 kilograms. In freestyle, he won the '21 Matteo Pellicone Ranking Series title, defeating Iran's Alireza Karimi in the final, is the reigning US National Champion and was also the '18 U23 World Championship and '19 US National Championship runner-up. As a folkstyle wrestler, he was a four-time NCAA Division I All-American, three-time Big Ten Conference champion and the '20 Dan Hodge Trophy runner-up for the Ohio State Buckeyes.

Folkstyle career

High school 
Moore attended Norwayne High School in Creston, Ohio, where he was a multiple–sport-athlete, competing in soccer, track, football and wrestling. He went 51–0 as a senior, not giving up an offensive point throughout the whole season and becoming the first OHSAA state champion of the school with a 23–8 technical fall in the finals, before graduating in 2015. A two–time Garfield Heights district champion, two–time state finalist and NHSCA All–American, Moore was the eleventh Ohioan to compile more than 200 victories, with a record of 204 wins and 11 losses (ten of them came in his first two years). As a soccer player, he was named the WCAL Player of the Year in 2014. He was also a standout student, with a 3.8 GPA. After capping off his high school career, Moore was recruited by the Ohio State Buckeyes.

College

2015-16 
Redshirt; While competing at 197 pounds, Moore compiled 25 wins and 4 losses, was the Findlay Open champion and placed second at the Eastern Michigan Open, third at the Penn State Open and fourth at the Michigan State Open.

2016-17 
Freshman; Tying Ohio State's record for total wins by a freshman, Moore racked up a 33–4 record, all four losses coming in the hands of the two NCAA finalists; J'den Cox, '16 Olympic Bronze medalist from Missouri and Brett Pfarr, returning All-American from Minnesota. He averaged 18 points per match that didn't end via pin, won the Eastern Michigan Open championship, placed third at the Cliff Keen Invitational and added up bonus points in 19 of his 33 victories. Moore claimed his first Big Ten Conference title after beating top-seeded Brett Pfarr and helped to clinch the team title, entering the NCAA's as the third seed. At the National Tournament, Moore was on a ride with three majors (two of them over the fourteenth and sixth seeds) on his way to the semifinals, but was topped by Pfarr in a frenetic 9–13 match to end the series 3–1 in favor of the Gopher. He was able to bounce back with a decision over seventh-seeded Aaron Studebaker from Nebraska and a pin over the fourth-seeded Jared Haught from Virginia Tech in the third-place match to claim the bronze, and All–American status. Moore was then named the Big Ten Freshman of the Year.

2017-18 
Sophomore; Moore started off the season with 18 straight wins and a Cliff Keen Invitational title, where he recorded a notable fall over Jared Haught from Virginia Tech. His losses of regular season came in the hands of future NCAA champions Anthony Cassar in a dual against Penn State and Michael Macchiavello in a dual against NC State. The number one seed, Moore won his second back–to–back Big Ten title. At the NCAA's, he reached the quarterfinals before being dropped by the unseeded Kyle Conel from KSU. After a series of victories over the second, fifth and fourteenth seeds, Moore was once again defeated by Conel to place fourth and become a two-time All-American.

2018-19 
Junior; To start off the season, Moore claimed his second straight prestigious Cliff Keen Invitational title and won seven dual meets in a row before suffering his first and only loss of the regular season, as he was pinned by two-time NCAA champion (184lbs) and returning Schalles Award winner from PSU Bo Nickal in the first period, in a match of undefeated-in-the-season wrestlers. Before regular season concluded, he racked up three more wins for the Buckeyes. At the Big Ten Conference Championships, the two-time and defending champion Moore made his third straight final, but fell once again to Bo Nickal in the finals. At the NCAA's, Moore, the second seed, hit a three–match win streak to reach the semis, where he dominantly defeated the third seeded Preston Weigel from Oklahoma State. In the finals, he was once again stopped by Bo Nickal, claiming runner–up honors.

2019-20 
Senior; In his final season as a collegiate athlete, Moore went undefeated at 27–0, claiming the Michigan State Open and the Cliff Keen Invitational titles, as well as going 14–0 in dual meets where he posted high–ranked victories. At the Big Ten Championships, the top–seeded Moore went 3–0 and cleaned out the bracket, defeating Nebraska's Eric Schultz in the finale to claim his third and last Conference title. Moore was a big favorite to claim his first NCAA title and the top–seed, however, the 2020 NCAA Division I National Championships was cancelled as a result of the COVID-19 outbreak, losing his opportunity of becoming an NCAA champion. After the season, Moore was voted as a runner–up for the prestigious Dan Hodge Trophy, behind Spencer Lee.

Freestyle career

Age-group 
Moore did not compete actively in freestyle during the folkstyle off-season, as he participated in other sports. In 2016, he placed seventh at the UWW US Junior National Championships, but despite that, was able to overcome the field from the US Junior World Team Trials and competed at the World Championships, placing twelfth. The returning US World Team Member, Moore made back-to-back team, by sweeping everyone in the bracket by technical fall. He earned a bronze medal from the World Championships.

Senior level

2018–2019 
A 21-year old junior, Moore made the '18 US U23 World Team on June, while also avenging his loss from the NCAA championships to Kyle Conel, defeating him twice by technical fall. On November, he competed at the U23 World Championships, defeating '18 Russian National bronze medalist Igor Ovsyannikov, two-time junior Pan American champion Nishan Randhawa, '16 University World Championship runner-up Yunus Dede and Magomed Zakariev to make the finals, where he was outclassed by '18 U23 European bronze medalist Givi Matcharashvili, claiming the silver medal for the United States.

Moore returned to competition in April 2019, and dropped down to 92 kilograms for the US Open as the fourth seed. After winning his first three matches, notably tech'ing '17 Henri Deglane International champion Timmy McCall, Moore was defeated by Hayden Zillmer in the semifinals, getting thrown to consolations, where he also lost to three–time NCAA DI All-American Timothy Dudley, but finally came back to defeat four-time NCAA DIII National Champion Riley Lefever, placing fifth. At the US World Team Trials of May, Moore tech'd Lefever for the second time, was defeated in a razor close bout against Zillmer, defeated McCall and was shockingly tech'd by Lefever.

On December, Moore competed at the US Senior Nationals, where after defeating '19 NCAA runner-up Derek White '18 Pan American Championship runner-up and '15 NCAA champion Kyven Gadson, he was downed in another closely contested 20-point bout against '15 US University National champion Hayden Zillmer, claiming runner-up honors and qualifying for the '20 US Olympic Team Trials.

2020–2021 
Moore was scheduled to compete at the 2020 US Olympic Team Trials on April 4–5, however, the event was postponed along with the Summer Olympics due to the COVID-19 pandemic. After a long lay-off due to the pandemic, Moore came back and flawlessly defeated '14 Pan American Championship bronze medalist and multiple time US Open All-American turned MMA fighter Deron Winn at the Chael Sonnen's Wrestling Underground I, on August.

Moore then demonstrated his improved skills when he claimed the US National Championship on October, defeating '19 Pac-12 Conference champion Nathan Traxler and '19 Dave Schultz Memorial International champion Ty Walz to make the semifinals, avenging his losses over Hayden Zillmer and once again defeating Kyven Gadson. A rematch with Gadson took place at the FloWrestling: Burroughs vs. Valencia card on November, where Gadson was forced to forfeit due to injury early in the match. On December, Moore represented the Ohio RTC at the FloWrestling RTC Cup, where after defeating Ty Walz and Scottie Boykin by technical fall, he was downed by Michael Macchiavello, in a bout where he Moore the edge but committed to his offense and was countered with a late takedown, dropping the match by criteria. He then defeated Hayden Zillmer once again, helping his team place fifth.

To start off the 2021 year, Moore competed at the prestigious Matteo Pellicone Ranking Series on March. In the quarter and semifinals, he took out '19 Junior European Champion Feuzullah Aktürk with ease, and dominated '20 Asian Championship bronze medalist Alisher Yergali to make the finale. In the finals, he faced '19 World Championship runner-up and '18 Asian Games gold medalist Alireza Karimi, and in a razor close match, Moore was able to edge the Iranian on criteria to claim the prestigious championship for the United States.

In April 2–3, Moore competed at the rescheduled US Olympic Team Trials as the top–seed, aside from Kyle Snyder and J'den Cox, as both were sitting out for later in the tournament (Cox would later be pulled from the event). He ran through the challenge bracket, defeating Braxton Amos, Ty Walz and dominantly avenging his last loss to Michael Macchiavello, scoring a flawless technical fall to advance to the best–of–three. In the finals, he faced former teammate and three–time World and Olympic champion Kyle Snyder, whom he was soundly defeated by twice, claiming runner–up honors.

Moore came back at the prestigious Poland Open on June 8, where he placed fifth after going 1–2, suffering losses to the dominant Mohammad Hossein Mohammadian and '19 World Championship runner–up Alireza Karimi in a rematch from their Matteo Pellicone Ranking Series bout.

Moore trimmed back down to 92 kilograms and registered to compete at the 2021 US World Team Trials on September 11–12 as the third-seed, intending to represent the country at the World Championships at his former weight class. After sweeping out the field on his way to the finals, Moore was downed twice in a row by the dominant two-time World Champion J'den Cox, losing the best-of-three series.

2022 

In 2022, he won one of the bronze medals in his event at the Yasar Dogu Tournament held in Istanbul, Turkey.

Freestyle record 

! colspan="7"| Senior Freestyle Matches
|-
!  Res.
!  Record
!  Opponent
!  Score
!  Date
!  Event
!  Location
|-
! style=background:white colspan=7 |
|-
|Loss
|46–15
|align=left| Kyle Snyder
|style="font-size:88%"|TF 2–12
|style="font-size:88%" rowspan=2|June 3, 2022
|style="font-size:88%" rowspan=2|2022 Final X: Stillwater
|style="text-align:left;font-size:88%;" rowspan=2|
 Stillwater, Oklahoma
|-
|Loss
|46–15
|align=left| Kyle Snyder
|style="font-size:88%"|TF 0–11
|-
|Win
|46–14
|align=left| Michael Macchiavello
|style="font-size:88%"|6–0
|style="font-size:88%" rowspan=4|May 21–22, 2022
|style="font-size:88%" rowspan=4|2022 US World Team Trials Challenge Tournament
|style="text-align:left;font-size:88%;" rowspan=4|
 Coralville, Iowa
|-
|Win
|45–14
|align=left| Michael Macchiavello
|style="font-size:88%"|TF 10–0
|-
|Win
|44–14
|align=left| Timothy Dudley
|style="font-size:88%"|7–4
|-
|Win
|43–14
|align=left| Jason Carter
|style="font-size:88%"|TF 10–0
|-
|Win
|42–14
|align=left| Nate Jackson
|style="font-size:88%"|4–4
|style="font-size:88%"|March 16, 2022
|style="font-size:88%"|Rudis+: Snyder vs. Cox
|style="text-align:left;font-size:88%;"|
 Detroit, Michigan
|-
! style=background:white colspan=7 |
|-
|Win
|41–14
|align=left| Burak Şahin
|style="font-size:88%"|3–1
|style="font-size:88%" rowspan=3|26 February 2022
|style="font-size:88%" rowspan=3|2022 Yasar Dogu International
|style="text-align:left;font-size:88%;" rowspan=3|
 Istanbul, Turkey
|-
|Loss
|40–14
|align=left| Alikhan Zhabrailov
|style="font-size:88%"|2–8
|-
|Win
|40–13
|align=left| Satyawart Kadian
|style="font-size:88%"|TF 12–1
|-
|Win
|39–13
|align=left| Evan Ramos
|style="font-size:88%"|TF 10–0
|style="font-size:88%"|February 12, 2022
|style="font-size:88%"|2022 Bout at the Ballpark
|style="text-align:left;font-size:88%;"|
 Arlington, Texas
|-
! style=background:white colspan=7 |
|-
|Loss
|38–13
|align=left| J'den Cox
|style="font-size:88%"|0–4
|style="font-size:88%" rowspan=2|September 12, 2021
|style="font-size:88%" rowspan=5|2021 US World Team Trials
|style="text-align:left;font-size:88%;" rowspan=5| Lincoln, Nebraska
|-
|Loss
|38–12
|align=left| J'den Cox
|style="font-size:88%"|0–5
|-
|Win
|38–11
|align=left| Nate Jackson
|style="font-size:88%"|12–6
|style="font-size:88%" rowspan=3|September 11, 2021
|-
|Win
|37–11
|align=left| Trent Hidlay
|style="font-size:88%"|5–4
|-
|Win
|36–11
|align=left| Miguel Baray
|style="font-size:88%"|TF 10–0
|-
! style=background:white colspan=7 |
|-
|Loss
|35–11
|align=left| Alireza Karimi
|style="font-size:88%"|2–2
|style="font-size:88%" rowspan=3|June 8, 2021
|style="font-size:88%" rowspan=3|2021 Poland Open
|style="text-align:left;font-size:88%;" rowspan=3|
 Warsaw, Poland
|-
|Win
|35–10
|align=left| Serik Bakytkhanov
|style="font-size:88%"|8–2
|-
|Loss
|34–10
|align=left| Mohammad Hossein Mohammadian
|style="font-size:88%"|TF 0–11
|-
! style=background:white colspan=7 |
|-
|Loss
|34–9
|align=left| Kyle Snyder
|style="font-size:88%"|1–5
|style="font-size:88%" rowspan=5|April 2–3, 2021
|style="font-size:88%" rowspan=5|2020 US Olympic Team Trials
|style="text-align:left;font-size:88%;" rowspan=5|
 Fort Worth, Texas
|-
|Loss
|34–8
|align=left| Kyle Snyder
|style="font-size:88%"|TF 0–10
|-
|Win
|34–7
|align=left| Michael Macchiavello
|style="font-size:88%"|TF 10–0
|-
|Win
|33–7
|align=left| Ty Walz
|style="font-size:88%"|6–3
|-
|Win
|32–7
|align=left| Braxton Amos
|style="font-size:88%"|TF 10–0
|-
! style=background:white colspan=7 |
|-
|Win
|31–7
|align=left| Alireza Karimi
|style="font-size:88%"|3–3
|style="font-size:88%" rowspan=3|March 6, 2021
|style="font-size:88%" rowspan=3|Matteo Pellicone Ranking Series 2021
|style="text-align:left;font-size:88%;" rowspan=3|
 Rome, Italy
|-
|Win
|30–7
|align=left| Alisher Yergali
|style="font-size:88%"|9–0
|-
|Win
|29–7
|align=left| Feyzullah Aktürk
|style="font-size:88%"|TF 12–1
|-
! style=background:white colspan=7 |
|-
|Win
|28–7
|align=left| Hayden Zillmer
|style="font-size:88%"|2–2
|style="font-size:88%" rowspan=4|December 4–5, 2020
|style="font-size:88%" rowspan=4|FloWrestling RTC Cup
|style="text-align:left;font-size:88%;" rowspan=4| Austin, Texas
|-
|Loss
|27–7
|align=left| Michael Macchiavello
|style="font-size:88%"|6–6
|-
|Win
|27–6
|align=left| Scottie Boykin
|style="font-size:88%"|TF 10–0
|-
|Win
|26–6
|align=left| Ty Walz
|style="font-size:88%"|TF 10–0
|-
|Win
|25–6
|align=left| Kyven Gadson
|style="font-size:88%"|INJ
|style="font-size:88%"|November 14, 2020
|style="font-size:88%"|FloWrestling: Burroughs vs. Valencia
|style="text-align:left;font-size:88%;" |
 Austin, Texas
|-
! style=background:white colspan=7 |
|-
|Win
|24–6
|align=left| Kyven Gadson
|style="font-size:88%"|12–5
|style="font-size:88%" rowspan=4|October 10–11, 2020
|style="font-size:88%" rowspan=4|2020 US Senior National Championships
|style="text-align:left;font-size:88%;" rowspan=4|
 Coralville, Iowa
|-
|Win
|23–6
|align=left| Hayden Zillmer
|style="font-size:88%"|6–5
|-
|Win
|22–6
|align=left| Ty Walz
|style="font-size:88%"|4–4
|-
|Win
|21–6
|align=left| Nathan Traxler
|style="font-size:88%"|TF 10–0
|-
|Win
|20–6
|align=left| Deron Winn
|style="font-size:88%"|7–0
|style="font-size:88%"|August 30, 2020
|style="font-size:88%"|Chael Sonnen's Wrestling Underground I
|style="text-align:left;font-size:88%;" |
 United States
|-
! style=background:white colspan=7 |
|-
|Loss
|19–6
|align=left| Hayden Zillmer
|style="font-size:88%"|10–10
|style="font-size:88%" rowspan=4|December 20–22, 2019
|style="font-size:88%" rowspan=4|2019 US Senior Nationals - US Olympic Trials Qualifier
|style="text-align:left;font-size:88%;" rowspan=4|
 Fort Worth, Texas
|-
|Win
|19–5
|align=left| Kyven Gadson
|style="font-size:88%"|6–3
|-
|Win
|18–5
|align=left| Derek White
|style="font-size:88%"|6–3
|-
|Win
|17–5
|align=left| Erik Hinckley
|style="font-size:88%"|TF 10–0
|-
! style=background:white colspan=7 |
|-
|Loss
|16–5
|align=left| Riley Lefever
|style="font-size:88%"|TF 0–11
|style="font-size:88%" rowspan=4|May 17–19, 2019
|style="font-size:88%" rowspan=4|2019 US World Team Trials Challenge
|style="text-align:left;font-size:88%;" rowspan=4| Raleigh, North Carolina
|-
|Win
|16–4
|align=left| Timmy Mccall
|style="font-size:88%"|10–6
|-
|Loss
|15–4
|align=left| Hayden Zillmer
|style="font-size:88%"|10–12
|-
|Win
|15–3
|align=left| Riley Lefever
|style="font-size:88%"|TF 11–0
|-
! style=background:white colspan=7 |
|-
|Win
|14–3
|align=left| Riley Lefever
|style="font-size:88%"|TF 15–4
|style="font-size:88%" rowspan=6|April 24–27, 2019
|style="font-size:88%" rowspan=6|2019 US Open National Championships
|style="text-align:left;font-size:88%;" rowspan=6|
 Las Vegas, Nevada
|-
|Loss
|13–3
|align=left| Timothy Dudley
|style="font-size:88%"|5–11
|-
|Loss
|13–2
|align=left| Hayden Zillmer
|style="font-size:88%"|7–12
|-
|Win
|13–1
|align=left| Timmy McCall
|style="font-size:88%"|TF 10–0
|-
|Win
|12–1
|align=left| Juan Durazo
|style="font-size:88%"|TF 10–0
|-
|Win
|11–1
|align=left| Gabriel Camarillo
|style="font-size:88%"|TF 10–0
|-
! style=background:white colspan=7 |
|-
|Loss
|10–1
|align=left| Givi Matcharashvili
|style="font-size:88%"|TF 0–10
|style="font-size:88%" rowspan=5|November 12–18, 2018
|style="font-size:88%" rowspan=5|2018 U23 World Championships
|style="text-align:left;font-size:88%;" rowspan=5|
 Bucharest, Romania
|-
|Win
|10–0
|align=left| Magomed Zakariev
|style="font-size:88%"|10–8
|-
|Win
|9–0
|align=left| Yunus Emre Dede
|style="font-size:88%"|TF 11–1
|-
|Win
|8–0
|align=left| Nishan Randhawa
|style="font-size:88%"|TF 10–0
|-
|Win
|7–0
|align=left| Igor Ovsyannikov
|style="font-size:88%"|6–5
|-
! style=background:white colspan=7 |
|-
|Win
|6–0
|align=left| Kyle Conel
|style="font-size:88%"|TF 13–3
|style="font-size:88%" rowspan=6|June 1–3, 2018
|style="font-size:88%" rowspan=6|2018 US U23 World Team Trials
|style="text-align:left;font-size:88%;" rowspan=6|
 Akron, Ohio
|-
|Win
|5–0
|align=left| Kyle Conel
|style="font-size:88%"|TF 12–2
|-
|Win
|4–0
|align=left| Malik McDonald
|style="font-size:88%"|TF 10–0
|-
|Win
|3–0
|align=left| Benjamin Honis
|style="font-size:88%"|11–8
|-
|Win
|2–0
|align=left| Jared Campbell
|style="font-size:88%"|TF 17–6
|-
|Win
|1–0
|align=left| Andrew Jones
|style="font-size:88%"|TF 10–0
|-

NCAA record 

! colspan="8"| NCAA Division I Record
|-
!  Res.
!  Record
!  Opponent
!  Score
!  Date
!  Event
|-
! style=background:lighgrey colspan=6 |End of 2019-2020 Season (senior year)
|-
! style=background:white colspan=6 |2020 Big Ten Championships  at 197 lbs
|-
|Win
|110–11
|align=left| Eric Schultz
|style="font-size:88%"|4–1
|style="font-size:88%" rowspan=3|March 7–8, 2020
|style="font-size:88%" rowspan=3|2020 Big Ten Conference Championships
|-
|Win
|109–11
|align=left| Lucas Davison
|style="font-size:88%"|MD 16–5
|-
|Win
|108–11
|align=left| Jackson Striggow
|style="font-size:88%"|MD 18–5
|-
|Win
|107–11
|align=left| Shakur Rasheed
|style="font-size:88%"|MD 14–6
|style="font-size:88%"|February 15, 2020
|style="font-size:88%"|Ohio State - Penn State Dual
|-
|Win
|106–11
|align=left| Lucas Davison
|style="font-size:88%"|14–9
|style="font-size:88%"|February 9, 2020
|style="font-size:88%"|Northwestern - Ohio State Dual
|-
|Win
|105–11
|align=left| Eric Schultz
|style="font-size:88%"|6–2
|style="font-size:88%"|February 2, 2020
|style="font-size:88%"|Ohio State - Nebraska Dual
|-
|Win
|104–11
|align=left| Niko Cappello
|style="font-size:88%"|Fall
|style="font-size:88%"|January 31, 2020
|style="font-size:88%"|Maryland - Ohio State Dual
|-
|Win
|103–11
|align=left| Hunter Ritter
|style="font-size:88%"|TF 19–3
|style="font-size:88%"|January 26, 2020
|style="font-size:88%"|Ohio State - Minnesota Dual
|-
|Win
|102–11
|align=left| Cash Wilcke
|style="font-size:88%"|8–3
|style="font-size:88%"|January 24, 2020
|style="font-size:88%"|Ohio State - Iowa Dual
|-
|Win
|101–11
|align=left| Matt Wroblewski
|style="font-size:88%"|Fall
|style="font-size:88%"|January 19, 2020
|style="font-size:88%"|Illinois - Ohio State Dual
|-
|Win
|100–11
|align=left| Peter Christensen
|style="font-size:88%"|TF 21–3
|style="font-size:88%"|January 17, 2020
|style="font-size:88%"|Ohio State - Wisconsin Dual
|-
|Win
|99–11
|align=left| Jordan Pagano
|style="font-size:88%"|MD 20–9
|style="font-size:88%"|January 10, 2020
|style="font-size:88%"|Rutgers - Ohio State Dual
|-
|Win
|98–11
|align=left| Kordell Norfleet
|style="font-size:88%"|11–9
|style="font-size:88%"|January 6, 2020
|style="font-size:88%"|Arizona State - Ohio State Dual
|-
! style=background:white colspan=6 | 2019 Cliff Keen Las Vegas Invite  at 197 lbs
|-
|Win
|97–11
|align=left| Christian Brunner
|style="font-size:88%"|MD 16–6
|style="font-size:88%" rowspan=5|December 6–7, 2019
|style="font-size:88%" rowspan=5|2019 Cliff Keen Invitational
|-
|Win
|96–11
|align=left| Thomas Lane
|style="font-size:88%"|TF 16–1
|-
|Win
|95–11
|align=left| Kordell Norfleet
|style="font-size:88%"|5–3
|-
|Win
|94–11
|align=left| Stan Smeltzer
|style="font-size:88%"|TF 19–4
|-
|Win
|93–11
|align=left| Ricardo Rodriguez
|style="font-size:88%"|Fall
|-
|Win
|92–11
|align=left| Jon Leow
|style="font-size:88%"|MD 18–6
|style="font-size:88%"|December 1, 2019
|style="font-size:88%"|Cornell - Ohio State Dual
|-
|Win
|91–11
|align=left| Stanley Smeltzer
|style="font-size:88%"|TF 24–9
|style="font-size:88%"|November 17, 2019
|style="font-size:88%"|Virginia Tech - Ohio State Dual
|-
|Win
|90–11
|align=left| Kellan Stout
|style="font-size:88%"|MD 12–3
|style="font-size:88%"|November 15, 2019
|style="font-size:88%"|Ohio State - Pittsburgh Dual
|-
|Win
|89–11
|align=left| Nathan Traxler
|style="font-size:88%"|MD 19–8
|style="font-size:88%"|November 10, 2019
|style="font-size:88%"|Stanford - Ohio State Dual
|-
! style=background:white colspan=6 | 2019 MSU Open  at 197 lbs
|-
|Win
|88–11
|align=left| Jakob Woodley
|style="font-size:88%"|SV–1 6–4
|style="font-size:88%" rowspan=5|November 2, 2019
|style="font-size:88%" rowspan=5|2019 Michigan State Open
|-
|Win
|87–11
|align=left| Landon Pelham
|style="font-size:88%"|TF 21–5
|-
|Win
|86–11
|align=left| Matt Wroblewski
|style="font-size:88%"|MD 16–5
|-
|Win
|85–11
|align=left| Thomas Penola
|style="font-size:88%"|MD 18–7
|-
|Win
|84–11
|align=left| Cole Nye
|style="font-size:88%"|Fall
|-
! style=background:lighgrey colspan=6 |Start of 2019-2020 Season (senior year)
|-
! style=background:lighgrey colspan=6 |End of 2018-2019 Season (junior year)
|-
! style=background:white colspan=6 |2019 NCAA Championships  at 197 lbs
|-
|Loss
|83–11
|align=left|Bo Nickal
|style="font-size:88%"|1–5
|style="font-size:88%" rowspan=5|March 21–23, 2019
|style="font-size:88%" rowspan=5|2019 NCAA Division I Wrestling Championships
|-
|Win
|83–10
|align=left|Preston Weigel 
|style="font-size:88%"|MD 12–4
|-
|Win
|82–10
|align=left|Tom Sleigh
|style="font-size:88%"|17–11
|-
|Win
|81–10
|align=left|Jake Woodley
|style="font-size:88%"|MD 14–4
|-
|Win
|80–10
|align=left|Brett Perry
|style="font-size:88%"|MD 12–3
|-
! style=background:white colspan=6 |2019 Big Ten Championships  at 197 lbs
|-
|Loss
|79–10
|align=left| Bo Nickal
|style="font-size:88%"|3–10
|style="font-size:88%" rowspan=4|March 3–4, 2019
|style="font-size:88%" rowspan=4|2019 Big Ten Conference Championships
|-
|Win
|79–9
|align=left| Jacob Warner
|style="font-size:88%"|5–2
|-
|Win
|78–9
|align=left| Dylan Anderson
|style="font-size:88%"|MD 12–4
|-
|Win
|77–9
|align=left| Matt Correnti
|style="font-size:88%"|MD 12–3
|-
|Win
|76–9
|align=left| Ben Honis
|style="font-size:88%"|MD 14–4
|style="font-size:88%"|February 22, 2019
|style="font-size:88%"|Ohio State - Cornell Dual
|-
|Win
|75–9
|align=left| Eric Schultz
|style="font-size:88%"|SV–1 7–5
|style="font-size:88%"|February 17, 2019
|style="font-size:88%"|Nebraska - Ohio State Dual
|-
|Win
|74–9
|align=left| Christian Brunner
|style="font-size:88%"|12–5
|style="font-size:88%"|February 15, 2019
|style="font-size:88%"|Ohio State - Purdue Dual
|-
|Loss
|73–9
|align=left| Bo Nickal
|style="font-size:88%"|Fall
|style="font-size:88%"|February 8, 2019
|style="font-size:88%"|Penn State - Ohio State Dual
|-
|Win
|73–8
|align=left| Zach Chakonis
|style="font-size:88%"|TF 19–4
|style="font-size:88%"|February 3, 2019
|style="font-size:88%"|Ohio State - Northwestern Dual
|-
|Win
|72–8
|align=left| Andre Lee
|style="font-size:88%"|Fall
|style="font-size:88%"|February 1, 2019
|style="font-size:88%"|Ohio State - Illinois Dual
|-
|Win
|71–8
|align=left| Jackson Striggow
|style="font-size:88%"|12–5
|style="font-size:88%"|January 25, 2019
|style="font-size:88%"|Michigan - Ohio State Dual
|-
|Win
|70–8
|align=left| Nick Hinz
|style="font-size:88%"|Fall
|style="font-size:88%"|January 13, 2019
|style="font-size:88%"|Michigan State - Ohio State Dual
|-
|Win
|69–8
|align=left| Jakob Hinz
|style="font-size:88%"|Fall
|style="font-size:88%"|January 11, 2019
|style="font-size:88%"|Ohio State - Indiana Dual
|-
|Win
|68–8
|align=left| Malik McDonald
|style="font-size:88%"|MD 15–6
|style="font-size:88%"|January 6, 2019
|style="font-size:88%"|North Carolina State - Ohio State Dual
|-
|Win
|67–8
|align=left| Andrew Salemme
|style="font-size:88%"|Fall
|style="font-size:88%"|December 9, 2018
|style="font-size:88%"|Wisconsin - Ohio State Dual
|-
! style=background:white colspan=6 |2018 Cliff Keen Las Vegas Invite  at 197 lbs
|-
|Win
|66–8
|align=left| Eric Schultz
|style="font-size:88%"|8–3
|style="font-size:88%" rowspan=6|November 30 – December 1, 2018
|style="font-size:88%" rowspan=6|2018 Cliff Keen Las Vegas Invitational
|-
|Win
|65–8
|align=left| Christian Brunner
|style="font-size:88%"|MD 22–11
|-
|Win
|64–8
|align=left| Ben Honis
|style="font-size:88%"|7–2
|-
|Win
|63–8
|align=left| Tom Lane
|style="font-size:88%"|13–6
|-
|Win
|62–8
|align=left| Cordell Eaton
|style="font-size:88%"|MD 12–3
|-
|Win
|61–8
|align=left| Cale Davidson
|style="font-size:88%"|MD 17–5
|-
! style=background:lighgrey colspan=6 |Start of 2018-2019 Season (junior year)
|-
! style=background:lighgrey colspan=6 |End of 2017-2018 Season (sophomore year)
|-
! style=background:white colspan=6 |2018 NCAA Championships 4th at 197 lbs
|-
|Loss
|60–8
|align=left| Kyle Conel
|style="font-size:88%"|3–5
|style="font-size:88%" rowspan=7|March 15–17, 2018
|style="font-size:88%" rowspan=7|2018 NCAA Division I Wrestling Championships
|-
|Win
|60–7
|align=left|Ben Darmstadt
|style="font-size:88%"|7–4
|-
|Win
|59–7
|align=left|Shakur Rasheed
|style="font-size:88%"|7–4
|-
|Win
|58–7
|align=left|Cash Wilcke
|style="font-size:88%"|6–2
|-
|Loss
|57–7
|align=left|Kyle Conel
|style="font-size:88%"|Fall
|-
|Win
|57–6
|align=left|Christian Brunner
|style="font-size:88%"|MD 14–4
|-
|Win
|56–6
|align=left|Tanner Orndorff
|style="font-size:88%"|12–8
|-
! style=background:white colspan=6 |2018 Big Ten Championships  at 197 lbs
|-
|Win
|55–6
|align=left| Shakur Rasheed
|style="font-size:88%"|8–4
|style="font-size:88%" rowspan=3|March 3–4, 2018
|style="font-size:88%" rowspan=3|2018 Big Ten Conference Championships
|-
|Win
|54–6
|align=left| Kevin Beazley
|style="font-size:88%"|5–3
|-
|Win
|53–6
|align=left| Eric Schultz
|style="font-size:88%"|10–4
|-
|Loss
|52–6
|align=left| Michael Macchiavello
|style="font-size:88%"|5–7
|style="font-size:88%"|February 18, 2018
|style="font-size:88%"|Ohio State - North Carolina State Dual
|-
|Win
|52–5
|align=left| Kevin Beazley
|style="font-size:88%"|MD 17–6
|style="font-size:88%"|February 11, 2018
|style="font-size:88%"|Ohio State - Michigan Dual
|-
|Loss
|51–5
|align=left| Anthony Cassar
|style="font-size:88%"|3–6
|style="font-size:88%"|February 3, 2018
|style="font-size:88%"|Penn State - Ohio State Dual
|-
|Win
|51–4
|align=left| Christian Brunner
|style="font-size:88%"|TF 18–3
|style="font-size:88%"|January 28, 2018
|style="font-size:88%"|Purdue - Ohio State Dual
|-
|Win
|50–4
|align=left| Nick May
|style="font-size:88%"|TF 20–2
|style="font-size:88%"|January 26, 2018
|style="font-size:88%"|Ohio State - Michigan State Dual
|-
|Win
|49–4
|align=left| Cash Wilcke 
|style="font-size:88%"|6–3
|style="font-size:88%"|January 21, 2018
|style="font-size:88%"|Iowa - Ohio State Dual
|-
|Win
|48–4
|align=left| Robert Steveson
|style="font-size:88%"|7–4
|style="font-size:88%"|January 12, 2018
|style="font-size:88%"|Minnesota - Ohio State Dual
|-
|Win
|47–4
|align=left| Anthony Messner
|style="font-size:88%"|MD 18–7
|style="font-size:88%"|January 7, 2018
|style="font-size:88%"|Ohio State - Rutgers Dual
|-
|Win
|46–4
|align=left| Mansur Abdul-Malik
|style="font-size:88%"|Fall
|style="font-size:88%"|January 5, 2018
|style="font-size:88%"|Ohio State - Maryland Dual
|-
|Win
|45–4
|align=left| Scottie Boykin
|style="font-size:88%"|MD 20–8
|style="font-size:88%"|December 17, 2017
|style="font-size:88%"|Ohio State - Chattanooga Dual
|-
|Win
|44–4
|align=left| Patrick Brucki
|style="font-size:88%"|MD 14–4
|style="font-size:88%"|December 15, 2017
|style="font-size:88%"|Ohio State - Princeton Dual
|-
|Win
|43–4
|align=left| Spencer Irick
|style="font-size:88%"|MD 14–4
|style="font-size:88%"|December 10, 2017
|style="font-size:88%"|Indiana - Ohio State Dual
|-
! style=background:white colspan=6 |2017 Cliff Keen Las Vegas Invite  at 197 lbs
|-
|Win
|42–4
|align=left| Jared Haught
|style="font-size:88%"|Fall
|style="font-size:88%" rowspan=6|December 1–2, 2017
|style="font-size:88%" rowspan=6|2017 Cliff Keen Las Vegas Invitational
|-
|Win
|41–4
|align=left| Matt Williams
|style="font-size:88%"|10–4
|-
|Win
|40–4
|align=left| Hunter Ritter
|style="font-size:88%"|MD 20–7
|-
|Win
|39–4
|align=left| Ben Honis
|style="font-size:88%"|5–3
|-
|Win
|38–4
|align=left| Eric Schultz
|style="font-size:88%"|3–2
|-
|Win
|37–4
|align=left| Tanner Orndorff
|style="font-size:88%"|15–11
|-
|Win
|36–4
|align=left| Shane Mast
|style="font-size:88%"|Fall
|style="font-size:88%" rowspan=2|November 21, 2017
|style="font-size:88%"|Kent State - Ohio State Dual
|-
|Win
|35–4
|align=left| John Kelbly
|style="font-size:88%"|TF 18–2
|style="font-size:88%"|Cleveland State - Ohio State Dual
|-
|Win
|34–4
|align=left| FF
|style="font-size:88%"|FOR
|style="font-size:88%"|November 12, 2017
|style="font-size:88%"|Arizona State - Ohio State Dual
|-
! style=background:lighgrey colspan=6 |Start of 2017-2018 Season (sophomore year)
|-
! style=background:lighgrey colspan=6 |End of 2016-2017 Season (freshman year)
|-
! style=background:white colspan=6 |2017 NCAA Championships  at 197 lbs
|-
|Win
|33–4
|align=left|Jared Haught
|style="font-size:88%"|Fall
|style="font-size:88%" rowspan=6|March 16–18, 2017
|style="font-size:88%" rowspan=6|2017 NCAA Division I Wrestling Championships
|-
|Win
|32–4
|align=left|Aaron Studebaker
|style="font-size:88%"|8–4
|-
|Loss
|31–4
|align=left|Brett Pfarr
|style="font-size:88%"|9–13
|-
|Win
|31–3
|align=left|Preston Weigel
|style="font-size:88%"|MD 13–5
|-
|Win
|30–3
|align=left|Corey Griego
|style="font-size:88%"|MD 16–4
|-
|Win
|29–3
|align=left|Malik McDonald
|style="font-size:88%"|MD 16–6
|-
! style=background:white colspan=6 |2017 Big Ten Championships  at 197 lbs
|-
|Win
|28–3
|align=left| Brett Pfarr
|style="font-size:88%"|15–11
|style="font-size:88%" rowspan=4|March 4, 2017
|style="font-size:88%" rowspan=4|2017 Big Ten Conference Championships
|-
|Win
|27–3
|align=left| Aaron Studebaker
|style="font-size:88%"|10–8
|-
|Win
|26–3
|align=left| Cash Wilcke
|style="font-size:88%"|10–5
|-
|Win
|25–3
|align=left| Jacob Hinz
|style="font-size:88%"|TF 21–5
|-
|Win
|24–3
|align=left| Benjamin Honis
|style="font-size:88%"|MD 20–9
|style="font-size:88%"|February 19, 2017
|style="font-size:88%"|Ohio State - Cornell Dual
|-
|Loss
|23–3
|align=left| Brett Pfarr
|style="font-size:88%"|5–7
|style="font-size:88%"|February 12, 2017
|style="font-size:88%"|Ohio State - Minnesota Dual
|-
|Win
|23–2
|align=left| Aaron Studebaker
|style="font-size:88%"|3–2
|style="font-size:88%"|February 10, 2017
|style="font-size:88%"|Ohio State - Nebraska Dual
|-
|Win
|22–2
|align=left| Matt Correnti
|style="font-size:88%"|MD 16–8
|style="font-size:88%"|February 6, 2017
|style="font-size:88%"|Rutgers - Ohio State Dual
|-
|Win
|21–2
|align=left| Matt McCutcheon
|style="font-size:88%"|9–6
|style="font-size:88%"|February 3, 2017
|style="font-size:88%"|Penn State - Ohio State Dual
|-
|Win
|20–2
|align=left| Cash Wilcke
|style="font-size:88%"|MD 19–7
|style="font-size:88%"|January 27, 2017
|style="font-size:88%"|Ohio State - Iowa Dual
|-
|Win
|19–2
|align=left| David Brian Whisler
|style="font-size:88%"|MD 17–7
|style="font-size:88%"|January 22, 2017
|style="font-size:88%"|Maryland - Ohio State Dual
|-
|Win
|18–2
|align=left| Andre Lee
|style="font-size:88%"|Fall
|style="font-size:88%"|January 15, 2017
|style="font-size:88%"|Illinois - Ohio State Dual
|-
|Win
|17–2
|align=left| Ricky Robertson
|style="font-size:88%"|MD 12–3
|style="font-size:88%"|January 6, 2017
|style="font-size:88%"|Ohio State - Wisconsin Dual
|-
|Win
|16–2
|align=left| Jacob Berkowitz
|style="font-size:88%"|MD 19–9
|style="font-size:88%"|December 18, 2016
|style="font-size:88%"|Northwestern - Ohio State Dual
|-
|Loss
|15–2
|align=left| J'den Cox
|style="font-size:88%"|4–6
|style="font-size:88%"|December 8, 2016
|style="font-size:88%"|Missouri - Ohio State Dual
|-
! style=background:white colspan=6 |2016 Cliff Keen Las Vegas Invite  at 197 lbs
|-
|Win
|15–1
|align=left| Jacob Smith
|style="font-size:88%"|9–7
|style="font-size:88%" rowspan=6|December 2, 2016
|style="font-size:88%" rowspan=6|2016 Cliff Keen Las Vegas Invitational
|-
|Win
|14–1
|align=left| Corey Griego
|style="font-size:88%"|11–6
|-
|Loss
|13–1
|align=left| Brett Pfarr
|style="font-size:88%"|MD 7–15
|-
|Win
|13–0
|align=left| Tanner Orndorff
|style="font-size:88%"|TF 20–5
|-
|Win
|12–0
|align=left| Anthony Mclaughlin
|style="font-size:88%"|2–1
|-
|Win
|11–0
|align=left| Harley Dilulo
|style="font-size:88%"|MD 18–7
|-
|Win
|10–0
|align=left| Stephen Suglio
|style="font-size:88%"|TF 21–4
|style="font-size:88%" rowspan=2|November 22, 2016
|style="font-size:88%"|Ohio State - Arizona State Dual
|-
|Win
|9–0
|align=left| Collin Kelly
|style="font-size:88%"|Fall
|style="font-size:88%"|Ohio State - Cleveland State Dual
|-
|Win
|8–0
|align=left| Sullivan Cauley
|style="font-size:88%"|Fall
|style="font-size:88%"|November 19, 2016
|style="font-size:88%"|Ohio State - Arizona State Dual
|-
! style=background:white colspan=6 |2016 Journeymen Collegiate Classic  at 197 lbs
|-
|Win
|7–0
|align=left| Ricky Robertson
|style="font-size:88%"|12–11
|style="font-size:88%" rowspan=3|November 13, 2016
|style="font-size:88%" rowspan=3|2016 Journeymen Collegiate Classic
|-
|Win
|6–0
|align=left| Freddy Vidal
|style="font-size:88%"|Fall
|-
|Win
|5–0
|align=left| Nathaniel Rose
|style="font-size:88%"|Fall
|-
! style=background:white colspan=6 |2016 Eastern Michigan Open  at 197 lbs
|-
|Win
|4–0
|align=left| Riley Lefever
|style="font-size:88%"|11–6
|style="font-size:88%" rowspan=4|November 5, 2016
|style="font-size:88%" rowspan=4|2016 Eastern Michigan Open
|-
|Win
|3–0
|align=left| Austin Severn
|style="font-size:88%"|12–6
|-
|Win
|2–0
|align=left| Jake Kleimola
|style="font-size:88%"|MD 15–7
|-
|Win
|1–0
|align=left| Landon Pelham
|style="font-size:88%"|TF 21–5
|-
! style=background:lighgrey colspan=6 |Start of 2016-2017 Season (freshman year)

Stats 

!  Season
!  Year
!  School
!  Rank
!  Weigh Class
!  Record
!  Win
!  Bonus
|-
|2020
|Senior
|rowspan=4|Ohio State University
|#1
|rowspan=4|197
|27–0
|100.00%
|74.07%
|-
|2019
|Junior
|#2
|33–4
|88.46%
|57.69%
|-
|2018
|Sophomore
|#4
|27–4
|87.10%
|41.94%
|-
|2017
|Freshman
|#3
|33–4
|89.19%
|56.76%
|-
|colspan=5 bgcolor="LIGHTGREY"|Career
|bgcolor="LIGHTGREY"|110–11
|bgcolor="LIGHTGREY"|90.91%
|bgcolor="LIGHTGREY"|.00%

References 

American male sport wrestlers
Living people
1997 births
People from Ohio
Ohio State Buckeyes wrestlers
Ohio State University alumni